Equestrian Portrait of the Duke of Lerma is an oil on canvas portrait of Francisco Gómez de Sandoval, 1st Duke of Lerma by Rubens, executed in 1603, now in the Prado in Madrid.

References

Duke of Lerma
Duke of Lerma
Duke of Lerma
1603 paintings
Duke of Lerma
Duke of Lerma
Paintings by Peter Paul Rubens in the Museo del Prado